Sredny Ostrov is a small island ('ostrov') and a military airfield in Krasnoyarsk Krai, Russia, located in the northern Kara Sea, off the archipelago of Severnaya Zemlya and almost  900 km north of Khatanga which in turn is on the Siberian coast.  Sredny is an ice airfield used as an alternate field for Tu-95 (Bear) bombers in the Arctic.  It was built in the late 1950s as a staging base for Soviet bombers to reach the United States, and was maintained by OGA (Arctic Control Group), which was a caretaker agency for strategic facilities in the Arctic.  In March 1979 2 Tu-128 (Fiddler) aircraft were based here.  The airfield is believed to be operational, operated by Frontier Guards (FSB) and capable of servicing An-26 and An-72 aircraft (it was in use as of January 2000, when an expedition bound for the North Pole recorded being flown there from Khatanga).

References

Russian Air Force bases
Soviet Air Force bases
Airports built in the Soviet Union
Airports in Krasnoyarsk Krai